Kochubeyevsky Park is a monument of landscape art of local significance in Baturyn, Nizhyn district, Chernihiv region, Ukraine. It is a part of the National Historical and Cultural Preserve "Hetman's Capital". 

It has an area of 9.9 hectares.

History 
The park was founded in the 19th century by the General Judge of Cossack Ukraine V. Kochubey. The basis of the park was an oak forest. The park combines regular and landscape planning, with natural and artificial plantations of different years, and about 34 species of trees and shrubs.

Monuments 
On the territory of the park there is an architectural monument of national importance, the House of the General Court (V. Kochubey's house) of the 17th century, mass graves of the Ukrainian Revolution and World War II, and monumental art of different periods, described below.

Monument to Ukrainian beekeeper Petro Prokopovych 
This monument to Petro Prokopovych was sculpted by Inna Kolomiets and erected in 1975.

Monument to Ukrainian writer Bohdan Lepky 
This monument to Bohdan Lepky was sculpted by Ivan Sonsyadlo and erected in 1999.

Memorial sign dedicated to Ukrainian hetmans 
The memorial sign to Ukrainian hetmans was erected in 1999. The inscription on the monument: "In the actions of the hetmans - the strength and state greatness of Ukraine."

Memorial sign dedicated to the oak 
The memorial was erected on May 22, 2003 on the site of an oak tree that for centuries had been a symbol of the love legend of Hetman Ivan Mazepa and Motri Kochubey.

Sculpture "Motrya" 
Sandstone sculpture created during the International Symposium "Baturyn-2008", and sculpted by Vladimir Protas.

Site of Kochubey's pond 
According to legend, this pond was arranged by Vasyl Kochubey in the early 17th century. For 200 years it was a place of rest for owners and guests of the park. According to the natives, by the middle of the 20th century there were many fish and turtles in the pond. In summer, children bathed in the pond, women washed clothes, and men bathed horses. From the middle of the 20th century the pond began to dry up. Today the reservoir is lost.

Visiting 
The territory of the park is constantly open to the public. Guides work on the schedule of the Museum of the Judge General Vasyl Kochubey House (Ukrainian: Будинок генерального судді Василя Кочубея).

Gallery

See also
Kochubey family
 Baturyn Museum of Archeology
 Citadel of Baturyn Fortress 
 House of Judge General Vasyl Kochubey
 Razumovski Palace

References

External links 
 Virtual tour of the museum
 Державний кадастр територій та об'єктів природно-заповідного фонду України станом на 01.01.2013; (639. Кочубеївський)
 Парк «Кочубеївський»  // Національний історико-культурний заповідник «Гетьманська столиця».

History museums in Ukraine
Tourist attractions in Chernihiv Oblast
Baturyn
Buildings and structures in Chernihiv Oblast